This is a list of newspapers in Utah

Major dailyThis is a list of newspapers published in Utah. See also List of newspapers in Utah.
Daily

A historic major paper was the Salt Lake Daily Herald, a daily newspaper in Salt Lake City from 1870 to 1920.

Regional and localRegional and local
 American Fork Citizen — Provo (discontinued in 2009)
 Basin Nickel Ads — Vernal
 The Beaver Press — Beaver
 Box Elder News Journal — Brigham City
 Canyon Country Zephyr — Moab
 Cedar City News — St. George
 Cedar City Review — Cedar City
 The City Journals — Sandy (formerly the Valley Journals, serving central and south Salt Lake County)
 Cottonwood Heights Journal
 Draper Journal
 Herriman Journal
 Holladay Journal
 Midvale Journal
 Millcreek Journal
 Murray Journal
 Riverton Journal (formerly South Valley Journal)
 Sandy Journal
 South Jordan Journal
 South Salt Lake Journal
 Sugarhouse Journal
 Taylorsville Journal
 West Jordan Journal
 West Valley City Journal
 Country Courier (formerly Color Country Courier)
 Davis County Clipper — Bountiful
 Emery County Progress — Castle Dale
 Goodwin's Weekly Salt Lake City, 1902-1929
 The Green Sheet — Castle Dale (discontinued in early 2000s)
 Hilltop Times — Hill Air Force Base
 Hurricane Valley Journal — Hurricane (discontinued)
 Intermountain Catholic — Salt Lake City
 Iron County Today — Cedar City
 The Leader (Utah) — Tremonton
 Lehi Free Press — Lehi (discontinued in 2009, restarted in 2015)
 Lone Peak Press — Pleasant Grove (discontinued in 2009)
 Magna Times — Magna
 Millard County Chronicle Progress — Delta
 Moab Times-Independent — Moab
 The Morgan County News — Morgan
 Nebo Reporter — Nephi (discontinued in 2011)
 Ogden Valley News — Ogden (discontinued)
 Orem Geneva Times — Orem (discontinued in 2009)
 Park Record — Park City
 The Payson Chronicle — Payson
 Pleasant Grove Review — Pleasant Grove (discontinued in 2009)
 Providence Citizen — Providence
 The Pyramid — Mount Pleasant
 QSaltLake — Salt Lake City
 The Richfield Reaper — Richfield
 Salt Lake City Weekly — Salt Lake City
 San Juan Record — Monticello
 San Pete Free Press — Manti (1902-1903 only)
 Sanpete Messenger — Manti
 Sentinel News — Ogden
 Serve Daily — Springville
 Smithfield Sun — Smithfield
 Southern Utah News — Kanab
 Spanish Fork Press — Spanish Fork (discontinued in 2011)
 The Spectrum — St. George
 Springville Herald — Springville (discontinued in 2011)
 St. George News — St. George
 Summit Creek Sentinel — Santaquin (discontinued)
 Sun Advocate — Price
 The Times-News — Nephi
 Tooele Times Daily News — Tooele
 Tooele Transcript-Bulletin — Tooele
 Uintah Basin Standard — Roosevelt
 Vernal Express — Vernal
 Wasatch County Courier — Heber City (discontinued in 2001)
 Wasatch Wave — Heber City
 Wendover Times — Wendover

College
</noinclude>College
 The Daily Universe — Brigham Young University
 The Student Review — Independent (Distributed off campus, serving BYU students, now defunct)
 The Daily Utah Chronicle — University of Utah
 The Forum — Westminster College
 The Globe — Salt Lake Community College
 UVU Review — Utah Valley University (formerly College Times)
 The Signpost — Weber State University
 The Snowdrift — Snow College
 SUU News — Southern Utah University (formerly University Journal)
 Sun News — Utah Tech University
 The Utah Statesman — Utah State University

See also

 List of Salt Lake City media
 List of television stations in Utah
 List of radio stations in Utah
 List of Latter Day Saint periodicals

References

External links

 
Utah
Newspapers in Utah
</noinclude>